Yinxiang (16 November 1686 – 18 June 1730), formally known as Prince Yi, was a Manchu prince of the Qing dynasty. The thirteenth son of the Kangxi Emperor, Yinxiang was a major ally of his brother Yinzhen (that is, the Yongzheng Emperor) during the latter's struggle for the succession of the throne. He was made a qinwang (first-grade prince) during Yongzheng's reign and became one of his closest advisors. He died eight years into the reign of the Yongzheng Emperor and was memorialized with top honours by the emperor. When he died, his title was granted "iron-cap" status and became perpetually inheritable, one of the only twelve such princes in Qing dynasty history.

Early life
Yinxiang was born in the Aisin Gioro clan as the 13th son of the Kangxi Emperor. The emperor had some 55 recorded consorts. Yinxiang's mother, Imperial Noble Consort Jingmin, was the daughter of the military commander Haikuan (海寬) from the Bordered White Banner. By the same birth mother, Yinxiang had two sisters, both of whom were younger than him. Yinxiang's mother died when he was 14, so he was raised by Consort De, the biological mother of Yinzhen (the future Yongzheng Emperor). This meant that he had an especially close relationship to Yinzhen from a young age.

Yinxiang was schooled in the arts and classics by Fahai, the second son of Tong Guogang, the maternal uncle of the Kangxi Emperor. Fahai was also the imperial tutor to Yinti, the 14th prince who was born to the same mother as Yinzhen. Both of Yinxiang's sisters died young shortly after being named hesuo princess and wedded respectively to Mongol princes. Yinxiang was a favorite of Kangxi from a young age. He accompanied his father on four inspection tours to the south. However, in 1709 when Kangxi bestowed noble titles to his various sons, Yinxiang was not among the recipients; his younger brother Yinti, however, was named a beizi. There is no explanation given in primary sources as to why Yinxiang was not granted a title in spite of seemingly being a favourite of his father.

During the succession battle among Kangxi's sons, Yinxiang was imprisoned by the Kangxi Emperor for 10 years. The historical record makes nearly no mention of Yinxiang between 1712 and 1722. It seems like during these years he did not achieve anything remarkable, but did nonetheless conceive several children.

Yongzheng reign
When the Kangxi Emperor died in 1722, Yinzhen succeeded to the throne as the Yongzheng Emperor. In the same year, Yinxiang was granted the title "Prince Yi of the First Rank" (怡親王); this Prince Yi peerage was one of the Qing dynasty's 12 "iron-cap" princely peerages. His personal name was also changed to "Yunxiang" (允祥) to avoid naming taboo because the Chinese character for "Yin" (胤) in "Yinxiang" is the same as the one in the Yongzheng Emperor's personal name "Yinzhen" (胤禛).

Yunxiang was a staunch supporter of the Yongzheng Emperor, and he worked tirelessly to assist the emperor in administrating state affairs despite suffering from poor health. Soon after Yongzheng ascended the throne, Yinxiang was named overseer of the three vaults of the Ministry of Revenue. In 1725, Yunxiang was sent to oversee the water issues in Zhili Province, including flood control and transport. He was still constantly affected by ill health when he returned to Beijing later.

Yunxiang died in June 1730 and was granted the posthumous name of "Zhongjingchengzhiqinshenlianmingxian" (忠敬誠直勤慎廉明賢), so his full posthumous title became Prince Yizhongjingchengzhiqinshenlianmingxian of the First Rank (和碩怡忠敬誠直勤慎廉明賢親王). The Yongzheng Emperor praised Yunxiang in his eulogy edict and declared a mourning period of three days, during which imperial court sessions were not held. In the edict, the Yongzheng Emperor also granted an exception by allowing Yunxiang's name to be reverted to "Yinxiang".

Succession of Prince Yi
Prince Yi was elevated to an "iron-cap prince" level peerage, that is, the title was to be perpetually inheritable by his successors. Yinxiang's sixth generation descendant Zaiyuan was a regent during the reign of the Tongzhi Emperor and was ousted in a coup.

Family 
Primary Consort

 Imperial Princess Consort Yixian, of the Joogiya clan (怡賢亲王福晋 兆佳氏)
 Princess of the Third Rank (郡主; 20 April 1707 – 4 April 1726), second daughter
 Married Fusengge (富僧額) of the Manchu Irgen Gioro clan in February/March 1723
 Hongdun, Prince of the Third Rank (貝勒 弘暾; 29 January 1711 – 24 August 1728), third son
 Hongjiao, Prince Ningliang of the Second Rank (寧良郡王 弘晈; 17 June 1713 – 9 September 1764), fourth son
 Princess Hehui of the Second Rank (和碩和惠公主; 16 November 1714 – 2 November 1731), fourth daughter
 Married Dorji Septeng (多爾濟塞布騰; d. 1735) of the Khalkha Borjigit clan on 6 December 1729
 Hongkuang (弘㫛; 30 January 1716 – 20 February 1722), fifth son
 Hongxiao, Prince Yixi of the First Rank (怡僖親王 弘曉; 23 May 1722 – 11 May 1778), seventh son
 Shou'en (綬恩; 12 October 1725 – 27 August 1727), eighth son

Secondary Consort

 Secondary consort, of the Gūwalgiya clan (側福晉 瓜爾佳氏)
 Princess of the Third Rank (郡主; 22 August 1703 – 23 February 1776), first daughter
 Married Sakexin (薩克信) of the Jinjili (津濟里) clan in May/June 1721
 Hongchang, Prince of the Third Rank (貝勒 弘昌; 14 December 1706 – 3 June 1771), first son

 Secondary consort, of the Fuca clan (側福晉 富察氏)
 Third daughter (14 December 1710 – December 1711 or January 1712)

 Secondary consort, of the Usun clan (側福晉 烏蘇氏)
 Hongqin, Prince of the Third Rank (貝勒 弘昑; 24 September 1716 – 28 February 1729), sixth son

Concubine

 Mistress, of the Šigiya clan (石佳氏)
 Second son (12 November 1708 – 30 March 1709)

 Mistress, of the Nara clan (那拉氏)
 Amuhulang (阿穆瑚瑯; 6 May 1726 – 5 May 1727), ninth son

Ancestry

In fiction and popular culture
 Portrayed by Zhou Haodong in Legend of YungChing (1997)
 Portrayed by Wang Hui in Yongzheng Dynasty (1999), Li Wei the Magistrate (2001) and Li Wei the Magistrate II (2004)
 Portrayed by Tian Zhenwei in Palace (2011)
 Portrayed by Yuan Hong in Scarlet Heart (2011)
 Portrayed by Chen Xiao in The Palace (2013)
portrayed by Wang An Yu in Dreaming back to the Qing Dynasty (2019 series) (2019)

See also
 Royal and noble ranks of the Qing dynasty#Male members
 Ranks of imperial consorts in China#Qing

References

External links
Yinxiang: How did he become involved in the fight for the throne?

1686 births
1730 deaths
Kangxi Emperor's sons
Manchu politicians
Qing dynasty politicians from Beijing
Grand Councillors of the Qing dynasty
Prince Yi(怡)